White Sun or Seto Surya is a 2016 drama war biographical film directed by Deepak Rauniyar. Written by Deepak Rauniyar, David Barker and Produced by Joslyn Barnes, Danny Glover, Tsering Rhitar Sherpa, and Deepak Rauniyar, under the banner of Aadi Productions with Louverture Films, The Bertha Foundation, Doha Film Institute, The Film Kitchen, Hubert Bals Fund, Mila Productions, Netherlands Fund for Film and Worley Works. The film stars Dayahang Rai and Rabindra Singh Baniya in the lead roles alongside Asha Magrati, Sumi Malla, Amrit Pariyar, Deepak Chetri and Deshbhakta Khanal. The film is based on Nepalese Civil War's conflict between royalists and Maoists.

It world premiered in the Horizons section at the 73rd edition of the Venice Film Festival. It was later screened at the 2016 Toronto International Film Festival. It was selected as the Nepali entry for the Best Foreign Language Film at the 90th Academy Awards, but it was not nominated.

Plot
When his father dies, anti-regime partisan Chandra must travel to his remote mountain village after nearly a decade away. Little Pooja is anxiously awaiting the man she thinks is her father, but she's confused when Chandra arrives with Badri, a young street orphan rumored to be his son. Chandra must face his brother Suraj, who was on the opposing side during the Nepali civil war. The two brothers cannot put aside political feelings while carrying their father's body down the steep mountain path to the river for cremation. Suraj storms off in a rage, leaving Chandra with no other men strong enough to help. Under pressure from the village elders, Chandra must seek help from outside the village to obey the rigid caste and discriminatory gender traditions he fought to eliminate during the war. Chandra searches for a solution in neighboring villages, among the police, guests at a local wedding, and rebel guerrillas...

Cast 
Ganesh Neupane (Munal) as Kaaji 
Dayahang Rai as Agni / Chandra
Asha Magrati as Durga 
Rabindra Singh Baniya as Suraj 
Sumi Malla as Pooja 
Amrit Pariyar as Badri
Pramod Agrahari as Police officer
Deepak Chhetri as Priest
Deshbhakta Khanal as Uncle

Awards

See also
List of submissions to the 90th Academy Awards for Best Foreign Language Film
List of Nepalese submissions for the Academy Award for Best Foreign Language Film

References

External links

2016 films
2016 biographical drama films
Qatari drama films
American biographical drama films
Films directed by Deepak Rauniyar
2016 drama films
Nepalese Civil War films
Nepalese biographical films
2010s American films